The Emil Grunzweig Human Rights Award is an award made annually by the Association for Civil Rights in Israel to "an individual or NGO that has made a unique contribution to the advancement of human rights in Israel". The award was established in 1981 but was renamed in 1983 after the murder of activist Emil Grunzweig by a grenade thrown by a right-wing activist during a Peace Now demonstration against the war in Lebanon.

Winners of the award
Winners of the award have included: 
1981 – Gabriel Stern, journalist for Al Hamishmar
1982 – Yehuda Litani, Haaretz reporter in the occupied territories; special posthumous recognition to Dr. Robert Walsh, a Jewish journalist in Germany
1983 – Lieutenant Colonel Dov Yirmiya, for his activities promoting the welfare of civilians in Lebanon; this was the first year the award was named after Emil Grunzweig
1984 – Moshe Negbi, editor of the radio program "Din Udvarim"
1985 – Baruch Meiri, journalist for Maariv
1986 – Prof. Yitzhak Zamir, former legal advisor to the government
1987 – High court justice Zvi Berenson
1988 – Reporters in the occupied territories
1989 – Alice Shalvi, the founder of the Israel Women's Network
1990 – Yitzhak Kadman, head of the Israel National Council for the Child
1991 – Dr. Lotta Saltzburger, a founder of the Hotline for Victims of Violence
1992 – Bassem Eid, the founder of the Palestinian Human Rights Monitoring Group; special award to Mr. James Ya'acov Rosenthal, journalist, for his lifelong devotion to human rights
1993 – Eyal Simchoni, attorney
1994 – Yitzhak Clinton Bailey, campaigner for Bedouin rights
1995 – Foundation for aid to women and girls victims of violence in the Arab sector
1996 – Gideon Levy, Haaretz journalist
1997 – "Community Advocacy", a legal organisation that assists residents of impoverished neighborhoods in obtaining their rights; the Gouarish family for agreeing to donate the organs of their son, killed by Israeli Defence Forces fire, to recipients both Jewish and Arab
1998 – Kav LaOved (Workers' Hotline), for their activities promoting the rights of foreign workers; Aluph Hareven; special lifetime award to Shulamit Aloni
1999 – Physicians for Human Rights and its founder Ruchama Marton
2000 – Haaretz journalist Dr. Yossi Algazi
2002 – Miriam Darmoni Sharvit and Sigal Rosen of the hotline for foreign workers
2003 – the women of Machsom Watch, organization of Israeli women who monitor checkpoints
2004 – Hanna Safran, feminist
2006 – Adva Center for analysis of Israeli policy
2007 – Kolech ("Your Voice", fem.), the religious Zionist feminist movement
2008 – The group for free legal aid for foreign workers at Tel Aviv University
2009 – Ruth and Paul Kedar of the Yesh Din organization for human rights
2011 – Tamar Pelleg-Sryck, attorney and human rights activist

External links
  Full list of prizewinners from 1991 onward.

Human rights awards
Israeli awards
Israeli human rights awards
Awards established in 1981
Lists of Israeli award winners